The 2019–20 New Jersey Devils season was the 46th season for the National Hockey League franchise that was established on June 11, 1974, and 38th season since the franchise relocated from Colorado prior to the 1982–83 NHL season. For the second time in three years, the Devils received the first overall pick in the 2019 NHL Entry Draft and selected Jack Hughes first overall. 

The season was suspended by the league officials on March 12, 2020, after several other professional and collegiate sports organizations followed suit as a result of the ongoing COVID-19 pandemic. On May 26, the NHL regular season was officially declared over with the remaining games being cancelled and the Devils missed the playoffs for the second straight year, as well as the seventh time in the past eight seasons.

Standings

Divisional standings

Conference standings

Schedule and results

Preseason
The preseason schedule was published on June 18, 2019.

Regular season
The regular season schedule was published on June 25, 2019.

Player statistics
As of March 12, 2020

Skaters

Goaltenders

Transactions
The Devils have been involved in the following transactions during the 2019–20 season.

Trades

Free agents

Contract terminations

Retirement

Signings

Draft picks

Below are the New Jersey Devils' selections at the 2019 NHL Entry Draft, which was held on June 21 and 22, 2019, at Rogers Arena in Vancouver, British Columbia.

Notes:
 The Boston Bruins' second-round pick went to the New Jersey Devils as the result of a trade on February 25, 2019, that sent Marcus Johansson to Boston in exchange for a fourth-round pick in 2020 and this pick.
 The Anaheim Ducks' third-round pick went to the New Jersey Devils as the result of a trade on November 30, 2017, that sent Adam Henrique, Joseph Blandisi and a third-round pick in 2018 to Anaheim in exchange for Sami Vatanen and this pick (being conditional at the time of the trade).
 The Dallas Stars' third-round pick went to the New Jersey Devils as the result of a trade on February 23, 2019, that sent Ben Lovejoy to Dallas in exchange for Connor Carrick and this pick.
 The Winnipeg Jets' third-round pick went to the New Jersey Devils as the result of a trade on June 22, 2019, that sent Nashville's second-round pick in 2019 (55th overall) to San Jose in exchange for a third-round pick in 2019 (91st overall) and this pick.
 The Washington Capitals' fourth-round pick went to the New Jersey Devils as the result of a trade on June 22, 2019, that sent San Jose's third-round pick in 2019 (91st overall) to Washington in exchange for Buffalo's fifth-round pick in 2019 (129th overall) and this pick.
 The Buffalo Sabres' fifth-round pick went to the New Jersey Devils as the result of a trade on June 22, 2019, that sent San Jose's third-round pick in 2019 (91st overall) to Washington in exchange for a fourth-round pick in 2019 (118th overall) and this pick.

References

New Jersey Devils seasons
New Jersey Devils
New Jersey Devils
New Jersey Devils
New Jersey Devils
21st century in Newark, New Jersey